A personal wiki is wiki software that allows individual users to organize information on their desktop or mobile computing devices in a manner similar to community wikis, but without collaborative software or multiple users.

Personal wiki software can be broadly divided into two categories:

 Multi-user applications with personal editions (such as MoinMoin or TWiki), installed for standalone use and inaccessible to outside users, which may require additional software such as a web server, database management system and/or WAMP/LAMP bundle
 Applications designed for single users, not dependent on a database engine or web server

Some personal wikis are public, but password-protected, and run on dedicated web servers or are hosted by third parties.

Multi-user wiki software
Multi-user wiki applications with personal editions include:
 MoinMoin desktop edition (written in Python)
 TWiki for Windows Personal and Certified TWiki (both written in Perl)
 MediaWiki (powers Wikipedia and many other wikis, written in PHP)
 DokuWiki on a Stick (written in PHP), which utilizes plain text files (and thus does not need a database like MediaWiki) and a syntax similar to MediaWiki

Single-user wiki software
There are also wiki applications designed for personal use, apps for mobile use, and apps for use from USB flash drives. They often include more features than traditional wikis, including:
 Dynamic tree views of the wiki
 Drag-and-drop support for images, text and video, mathematics
 Use of OLE or Linkback to allow wikis to act as relational superstructures for multiple desktop-type documents
 Multimedia embedding, with links to internal aspects of movies, soundtracks, notes and comments
 Macros and macro scripting

Notable examples include:

 ConnectedText, a commercial Windows-based personal wiki system that includes full-text searches, a visual link tree, a customizable interface, image and file control, CSS-based page display, HTML and HTML Help exporting, and plug-ins
 Gnote, a port of Tomboy to C++ (although not all plug-ins have been ported)
 MyInfo, a Windows-based free form personal information manager that includes wiki-style linking between notes, full-text search, different views of the note list, and web-site export
 Obsidian is a knowledge base and note-taking software application that operates on Markdown files.
 org-mode, an Emacs mode that can create documents that are interlinked, converted to HTML, and automatically uploaded to a web server
 TiddlyWiki, a highly customizable personal wiki written in HTML and JavaScript; it is provided as a single HTML file or multiple Node-js files, features many tools and plugins, and has been in active development since 2004 as free and open-source (BSD) software
 Tomboy, a (LGPL) free software wiki-style note-taking program that allows easy organisation of any hierarchical data, hosted on GNOME CVS
 Vim, which can be used as a personal wiki via plugins such as Vimwiki
 Zim, a free, open-source standalone wiki based on Python and GTK, with a WYSIWYG editor

See also
 Card file
 Commonplace book
 Comparison of wiki software
 List of wiki software
 Notetaking
 Outliner
 Personal information manager
 Personal knowledge base
 Personal knowledge management

References

 
Personal information managers
Note-taking
Knowledge management